Bardhaman Purba Lok Sabha constituency is one of the 543 parliamentary constituencies in India. The constituency is based on Purba Bardhaman district in West Bengal. All the seven assembly segments of No. 38 Bardhaman Purba Lok Sabha constituency are in Purba Bardhaman district. The seat is reserved for scheduled castes.

As per order of the Delimitation Commission in respect of the delimitation of constituencies in the West Bengal, Burdwan Lok Sabha constituency, Katwa Lok Sabha constituency and Durgapur Lok Sabha constituency ceased to exist from 2009 and new constituencies came into being: Bardhaman Purba Lok Sabha constituency and Bardhaman-Durgapur Lok Sabha constituency.

Assembly segments

Bardhaman Purba Lok Sabha constituency (parliamentary constituency no. 38) is composed of the following assembly segments:

Members of Parliament

For Members of Parliament from this area in previous years see Burdwan Lok Sabha constituency and Katwa Lok Sabha constituency

Election results

General election 2019

General election 2014

General election 2009

See also
 List of Constituencies of the Lok Sabha

References

Lok Sabha constituencies in West Bengal
Politics of Purba Bardhaman district